Eltham Manor is a historic estate located near Bassett, Henry County, Virginia. It was built in 1936 by William McKinley Bassett, and is a Colonial Revival brick dwelling. The manor is named for the Burwell Bassett family home, "Eltham Plantation", in Eltham, Virginia, that burned in 1879. It consists of a -story, five bay, central section flanked by two-story wings, connected by cured hyphens to a two-story garage and servant's quarters at the north end and a one-story open-air pavilion at the south end. The front facade features a Doric order portico with smooth two-story columns. Also on the property are a contributing barn (c. 1936) and lake (c. 1936).

It was listed on the National Register of Historic Places in 1999.

References

Houses on the National Register of Historic Places in Virginia
Colonial Revival architecture in Virginia
Houses completed in 1936
Houses in Henry County, Virginia
National Register of Historic Places in Henry County, Virginia